Tomares callimachus, the Caucasian vernal copper, is a butterfly of the family Lycaenidae. It is found in Anatolia, Iraq, Iran, the Caucasus, and Transcaucasia.

Description in Seitz
T. callimachus Ev. (= epiphania Boisd., hafis Koll.) (75 e). Above bright fiery cinnabar-red, margins and base of wings black, fringes chequered with brown. Hindwing beneath earth-brown, fasciated with dark brown and minutely dotted with black. Coasts of the Black Sea, Persia and Ferghana. — In the form dentata Stgr., from northern Mesopotamia and Asia Minor, the black distal margin of the wings is very strongly dentate and the hindwing beneath is grey-brown. — Larva reddish yellow-brown, with dark dorsal line and pale lateral one, between which there is a dark stripe composed of small oblique spots; on Astragalus physodes. The butterflies in April and May on hills, not rare.

The wingspan is 18–23 mm. The species inhabits semi-deserts and arid mountain steppes. It occupies an elevation range from 1000 to 2000 m above sea level. The butterfly flies from late March to early June depending on latitude and elevation.

The larvae feed on the Astragalus species A. physodes and A. vulpinus.

Subspecies
Tomares callimachus callimachus
Tomares callimachus tauricus Korb & Yakovlev, 1998 (Crimea)

References

External links
 "Tomares Rambur, 1840" at Markku Savela's Lepidoptera and Some Other Life Forms
 Butterfly Conservation Armenia

Butterflies described in 1848
Theclinae